Bothriomyrmex urartus is a species of ant in the genus Bothriomyrmex. Described by Dubovikov in 2002, the species is endemic to Armenia.

References

Bothriomyrmex
Hymenoptera of Asia
Insects described in 2002